Andrea Alice Stewart-Cousins (née Stewart; born September 2, 1950) is an American politician and educator from Yonkers, New York. A member of the Democratic Party, Stewart-Cousins has represented District 35 in the New York State Senate since 2007 and has served as Majority Leader and Temporary President of that body since 2019. She has previously served twice as acting lieutenant governor of New York under Governor Kathy Hochul,  for 16 days in 2021 and between April and May 2022. Stewart-Cousins is the first Black woman to serve as the New York lieutenant governor, although in an acting capacity. She is the first woman in the history of New York State to lead a conference in the New York State Legislature and is also the first female Senate Majority Leader in New York history.

Stewart-Cousins was first elected to the New York State Senate in 2006. She previously served as a Westchester County Legislator from 1996 to 2006. In 2012, she was chosen by her colleagues to lead the Senate Democratic Conference. After the Democratic Party won an outright Senate majority in the 2018 elections, Stewart-Cousins became Majority Leader in January 2019. She became acting lieutenant governor on August 24, 2021, when Governor Andrew Cuomo resigned and Lieutenant Governor Kathy Hochul ascended to the governorship. Hochul announced she would be appointing a lieutenant governor, following the precedent set in 2009 by Governor David Paterson's appointment of Lieutenant Governor Richard Ravitch. Hochul selected Brian Benjamin, who took office on September 9, 2021. However, Benjamin resigned less than a year later on April 12, 2022 after being arrested in a corruption scandal. This caused Stewart-Cousins to once again assume the role of acting Lieutenant Governor.

Early life and education

Andrea Alice Stewart was born on September 2, 1950, in New York City. She is the daughter of Bob Stewart, a decorated World War II veteran and repairman, and Beryl Stewart, a stenographer and community activist. The Stewart family resided in public housing in Manhattan and the Bronx, and Andrea suffered from chronic asthma.

Stewart-Cousins spent twenty years in the private sector, including thirteen years in sales and marketing with New York Telephone (later known as AT&T). After New York Telephone went out of business, she received a buyout and pursued a college degree while working for Gannett. She earned her Bachelor of Science Degree from Pace University and her teaching credentials in Business Education from Lehman College. She received her Masters of Public Administration from Pace University in May 2008 and is a member of Pi Alpha Alpha, the public administration honor society. She also pursued careers in journalism and teaching before entering public service.

Career

Yonkers Director of Community Affairs
Stewart-Cousins's public service career began in 1992 when she was appointed Director of Community Affairs in the City of Yonkers. In that role, she created an internship program for the hearing-impaired and for children in working families. She also advocated for and contributed to the revitalization of the City of Yonkers and was a founder of the original "Art on Main Street". Stewart-Cousins was a co-creator of "River Fest", a widely attended multi-cultural citywide celebration on the Hudson River in Yonkers.

Westchester County Legislator
Prior to her election to the New York State Senate in 2006, Stewart-Cousins served as a Westchester County Legislator representing Yonkers. First elected in 1995, she served from 1996 to 2006. During her tenure, she was elected Majority Whip and Vice-Chair. Stewart-Cousins authored living wage laws, smoke-free workplace laws, tougher gun laws, laws that prosecute predatory lenders, tax cuts for seniors and veterans, and Westchester County's first human rights laws.

New York State Senate
Stewart-Cousins first ran for New York State Senate in 2004, but incumbent Republican Sen. Nicholas Spano defeated her by a margin of 18 votes. In 2006, she challenged Spano again and defeated him. As of 2019, Senate District 35 includes all of Greenburgh and Scarsdale and portions of Yonkers, White Plains and New Rochelle.

Stewart-Cousins voted in favor of same-sex marriage legislation on December 2, 2009, but the bill was defeated. A same-sex marriage law was eventually passed in 2011. Stewart-Cousins is a vocal supporter of abortion rights, and has pushed for legislation to expand abortion access in the State of New York.

On April 17, 2010, it was reported that Stewart-Cousins was under consideration by then-gubernatorial candidate Andrew Cuomo to be his running mate. Cuomo ultimately chose Rochester mayor Bob Duffy instead.

Senate Democratic Leader
On December 17, 2012, Stewart-Cousins was elected Senate Democratic Leader. Stewart-Cousins is the first woman in history to lead a conference in the New York State Legislature.

Senate Majority Leader
The Democratic Party won a Senate majority in the 2018 elections. On January 9, 2019, Stewart-Cousins was elected Senate Majority Leader. She serves as the body's Majority Leader and Temporary President, and is the first female Senate Majority Leader in New York history. In 2019, Stewart-Cousins sponsored the Housing Stability and Tenant Protection Act of 2019, which overhauled the rules affecting rent-controlled apartments in New York City. During Stewart-Cousins's first year as Senate Majority Leader, New York passed a variety of progressive laws on issues like climate change, voting rights, abortion rights, criminal justice reform, gender equality, gun control, marijuana decriminalization, LGBT rights, and immigration. According to City & State New York, Stewart-Cousins employs a "consensus-driven approach" to leading the Senate Democratic Conference that sets her "apart from her predecessors".

Following the resignation of Gov. Andrew Cuomo due to multiple allegations of sexual harassment, Lt. Gov. Kathy Hochul succeeded him as governor. Per state law, as state Senate Majority Leader, Stewart-Cousins became the state's Acting lieutenant governor until Hochul appointed a full-time replacement. She was the first Black woman to serve in this role. This was also the first time New York was governed by both a female governor and lieutenant governor.

Honors
In 2019, Stewart-Cousins was named to Crain's New York Business biennial list of the "Most Powerful Women in New York".

In February 2021, she was presented with the Nelson A. Rockefeller Award for 2020.

On September 14, 2021 Stewart-Cousins received the Samuel Untermyer award for distinguished civic leadership. She was honored at Untermyer Gardens in her hometown of Yonkers, New York.

Personal life 
In 1979, Stewart married Thomas Cousins, and the couple moved to Yonkers. Stewart-Cousins has three children and four grandchildren. Thomas Cousins died on November 26, 2007.

Electoral history

Westchester County Legislature

New York State Senate

See also
 2009 New York State Senate leadership crisis
 List of minority governors and lieutenant governors in the United States

References

External links

 New York State Senate: Andrea Stewart-Cousins

|-

|-

|-

|-

1950 births
2020 United States presidential electors
20th-century African-American people
20th-century African-American women
21st-century African-American women
21st-century American politicians
21st-century American women politicians
African-American history of Westchester County, New York
African-American state legislators in New York (state)
African-American women in politics
Legislators from Westchester County, New York
Lehman College alumni
Lieutenant Governors of New York (state)
Living people
Democratic Party New York (state) state senators
Pace University alumni
Women state legislators in New York (state)